The women's sprint freestyle at the 2007 Asian Winter Games was held on January 30, 2007 at Beida Lake Skiing Resort, China.

Schedule
All times are China Standard Time (UTC+08:00)

Results

Qualification

1/4 finals

Heat 1

Heat 2

Heat 3

Heat 4

Semifinals

Heat 1

Heat 2

Finals

Final B

Final A

References

Results FIS

External links
Results of the Fifth Winter Asian Games

Women sprint freestyle